St Edmund's School is a coeducational nursery, pre-prep, preparatory and senior school located in Hindhead, Surrey, around 10.5 miles south-west from the town of Guildford. It was founded in Hunstanton, Norfolk, in 1874.

History

The school's original buildings in Hunstanton was purchased in 1901 by Howard Cambridge Barber and became the home of Glebe House School.

As the school developed through the 20th century it established itself as a traditional English Preparatory school, preparing its pupils for senior, public school education, regularly sending pupils to the likes of Eton College, Cranleigh, Charterhouse and Canford. In 1968 the school had 130 boarders, and 25 day boys "taken for the first two years". In 1979 The St Edmund's School Charitable Trust was formed to help take the school forward, with Richard Saunders, an old boy, becoming its first Chairman of Governors.

For most of its existence St Edmund's was for boys only, however, with the first girls being admitted in 2008, the school is now co-educational. In 2014 the ISI report listed it as having 249 pupils. 173 boys and 76 girls.

The school's transition into a modern-day public school has seen it dropping traditional Saturday school for Optional Saturday Morning Activities. It operates a flexi-boarding system. A programme of refurbishments and building projects included a new teaching block (the W. H. Auden Centre), opened by Sir Bruce Forsyth CBE in October 2014.

Notable former pupils 
And see Category:People educated at St Edmund's School, Hindhead

 King Abdullah II - King of Jordan
 Prince Faisal bin Hussein - younger brother of King Abdullah II of Jordan
 Timothy Garton Ash CMG FRSA - British historian, author, commentator and Oxford professor
 John Bicknell Auden - Geologist, explorer and WHO official 
 W. H. Auden - Poet
 Marcus Brigstocke - Comedian, television and radio personality
 Forde Everard de Wend Cayley (1915-2004) -  MD, RAMC, MBE, FRCP,  World War II POW camp survivor
 Jonathan Dimbleby - Television and radio presenter, writer and political commentator
 Guy Farley - Musician and film composer 
 Christopher Isherwood - Novelist
 Anthony Loyd - Journalist and war correspondent
 Iain Mackay-Dick KVCO MBE - Major General of the Household Division and GCO of the London District
 Harold Edward Musson - Buddhist monk and author
 Wilfrid Noyce -  English mountaineer and author. He was a member of the 1953 British Expedition that made the first ascent of Mount Everest
 John Schlesinger - Academy award winning film director
 John Shearman - Art historian
 Guy Siner - Stage, television and film actor
 Anthony Trafford, Baron Trafford - aristocrat, politician and physician
 John F. C. Turner - Architect and theorist
 Michael Ward - Expedition doctor of the first ascent of Mount Everest in 1953

Headmasters
1874 to 1899 Rev. J. Morgan-Brown MA (Oxf)
1899 to 1929 Cyril Morgan Brown,
1929 to 1933 Ivor Sant 
1933 to 1952 Ivo Bulley
1952 to 1978 Peter Weeks MA (Cantab)
1978 to 1991 Tony Pull (Oxf)
1991 to 1995 Andrew Sangster
1995 to 2000 Andrew Fowler-Watt
2000 to present A. J. Walliker, MA (Cantab)

Notes

External links 
Official St. Edmund's School website

Preparatory schools in Surrey